"Woo Hoo" is a rockabilly song, credited to Virginia country music DJ and music store/recording company   George Donald McGraw and originally released by The Rock-A-Teens in 1959.

It is also the title track of The Rock-A-Teens 1959 album featuring the songs: "Woo Hoo"; "Doggone It Baby"; "I'm Not Afraid"; "That's My Mama"; "Dance to the Bop"; "Story of a Woman"; "Twangy"; "Janis Will Rock"; "Pagan"; "Lotta Boppin'"; "Oh My Nerves"; and "I Was Born to Rock".

Original version
The song is distinctive for its lack of lyrics apart from its title words, which gave it popularity around the world as it is not subject to language barriers.  It makes use of the twelve-bar blues chord progression, further adding to its accessibility.
The song is featured in the end credits of John Waters's film Pecker.

Musicians
Vic Mizelle (vocals, guitar)
Bobby "Boo" Walke (guitar)
Bill Cook (guitar)
Eddie Robinson (sax) 
Paul Dixon (bass)
Bill Smith (drums)

Cover versions
It was later covered by the Scottish rock band, The Revillos, (under the name "Yeah Yeah"), under the same title by the French psychobilly (or as they say themselves, "yé-yé-punk") band Les Wampas on their 1988 album, Chauds, sales et humides, by the Japanese girl band The 5.6.7.8's on their 1996 album Bomb the Twist and as a dance/electronica track in 2005 by the American act The Daltronics. It was also covered by Showaddywaddy. The Replacements have also performed it in concert on several occasions.

The 5.6.7.8's version gained cult popularity when it was featured and performed by them in Quentin Tarantino's 2003 movie Kill Bill: Vol. 1 and appears on its soundtrack. Additionally, it appears in the movie Glory Road. In 2004, after appearing in Kill Bill: Vol. 1 and an advertisement for Carling beer, the cover peaked at No. 28 on the UK Singles Chart, a rare Western singles chart appearance for a Japanese band. The song is also used, in part, in a Vonage advertising campaign in the United States. It is also used in the soundtrack of the 2013 video game Rayman Legends called Gloo Gloo.

References

1959 singles
1959 songs
The Rock-A-Teens songs
Roulette Records singles